Abdul Qahar bin Mukmin (born 1817 - unknown), who is better known as Datuk Siamang Gagap, was a fighter from Seri Menanti, Negeri Sembilan.

History

As a palace official, he was one of the commanders who supported Tuanku Antah and the Undang-Undang in the Battle of Bukit Putus, as Tuanku Antah fought Tuanku Ahmad Tunggal for the succession of the throne, and defended against British intervention.

He later fought against the British late into the 1870s, earning him his reputation as a folk hero.

References
 
 

1817 births
History of Negeri Sembilan
People from Negeri Sembilan
Minangkabau people
People from British Malaya
Malaysian warriors
Malaysian rebels
Year of death missing